Vladimir Nikolayevich Baksheyev (born 22 April 1970) is a former Russian professional footballer.

Club career
He made his professional debut in the Soviet Second League in 1988 for FC Avtomobilist Krasnoyarsk. He played 2 games in the European Cup Winners' Cup 1992–93 for FC Spartak Moscow.

Honours
 Russian Premier League champion: 1992.

References

1970 births
Sportspeople from Krasnoyarsk
Living people
Soviet footballers
Russian footballers
Association football midfielders
FC Spartak Moscow players
Russian Premier League players
Expatriate footballers in Kazakhstan
FC Saturn Ramenskoye players
FC Tobol players
Russian expatriate sportspeople in Kazakhstan
FC Yenisey Krasnoyarsk players
FC Nosta Novotroitsk players